Kenneth Bryan Dart (born 1955) is a Cayman Islands-based businessman and billionaire. He is also a citizen of Belize and Ireland. His wealth was estimated in 2013 at $6.6 billion. He is an heir of William F. Dart, who founded the Dart Container Corporation (originally the Dart Manufacturing Company) in Michigan in 1937.

Early life and career
Dart graduated from the University of Michigan with a degree in mechanical engineering in 1976. He joined the family business and became president of the Dart Container Corporation in 1986. His brother Robert succeeded him in this role in 2001, when Kenneth moved to the board of directors.

In the mid-1990s Dart and his brother, Robert, both renounced their American citizenship. Kenneth took Caymanian, Belizean and, later, Irish citizenship. Robert holds Belizean and Irish citizenship, and resides in London. Kenneth Dart moved his residence to the Cayman Islands and converted what was the beachfront West Indian club into his home in 1994.

Businesses 
Dart started a number of Cayman-based enterprises, including Dart Enterprises, Dart Realty, and Cayman Shores Development. By 2012, his Caymanian enterprises were estimated to own about 20–25% of the real estate in the Cayman Islands. Among his properties are Camana Bay (formerly the Coral Caymanian Hotel), the Ritz-Carlton, the Yacht Club, and the Kimpton Seafire Resort and Spa. Dart has his own construction company, Decco.

In 1994, Dart became a citizen of Belize. At that time Dart offered his residence in Sarasota, Florida, to the government of Belize as a consulate with himself as its consul. This would have allowed him to live in the United States full-time as a foreign diplomat avoiding any actions by the Internal Revenue Service; the State Department rejected the arrangement. The Reed Amendment of 1996, a tightening of U.S. tax laws concerning expatriates, was partially spurred by the Dart brothers' renunciation of their citizenship to avoid paying taxes.

Controversy
Dart owns Dart Management, "one of the best known of the so-called vulture funds." The strategy of vulture funds is to buy government debts at sharply reduced prices when weak governments are in crisis, and eventually force these governments to pay the full amount of the debt. Dart employed this strategy in 1994 by acquiring Brazilian debt instruments and eventually generating a profit of about $600 million.

In the Greek financial crisis, Dart was a winner by forcing the Greek government to pay €436 million in 2012, 90% of which went to his fund.

In the prolonged attempts to resolve the Argentinian financial crisis of 2001, Dart and Paul Singer rejected Argentina's restructuring offer in contrast to most other investors and brought their claim to the US court system. In response to Dart's holdout strategy, the then Argentinian ambassador in the US, Jorge Argüello, rebuked Dart's activities, while in the Argentinian press Dart was named "Enemy Number One of Argentina".

In 2012, a New York State judge ruled in favor of the holdout creditors ordering Argentina to pay $1.3 billion and Argentina's appeal of the ruling at the US Supreme Court was rejected in 2014. The rulings forced Argentina to miss bond payments in July 2014, which caused the country to be declared in selective default by Standard & Poor's and in restrictive default by Fitch Ratings, meaning that Argentina failed to meet some of their obligations while meeting others. By 2017, Argentina's  new president Mauricio Macri settled with holdouts and was able to access the international capital markets.

In 2021, Dart made a $6.7 billion bet on tobacco stocks, considered a contrarian move in regards to Environmental, social and corporate governance related investments.

See also 

 Tom Morris
 Giovanni Ferrero

References

1955 births
Living people
Belizean billionaires
Belizean people of American descent
Caymanian billionaires
Caymanian people of American descent
Irish billionaires
Irish people of American descent
University of Michigan College of Engineering alumni
People who renounced United States citizenship
Place of birth missing (living people)
Date of birth missing (living people)